Harvey Freeman may refer to:

Harvey Freeman (baseball) (1897–1970), American baseball player
Harvey Freeman (EastEnders), fictional character